The PDOC Headquarters is a high-rise building located in Khartoum, Sudan. The building was designed by Engineering Consultants Group S.A.

References

Buildings and structures in Khartoum